I Was Dancing is a play by Edwin O'Connor. The work premiered on Broadway at the Lyceum Theatre on November 3, 1964 and closed after 21 performances on November 21, 1964. The production was directed by Garson Kanin and starred Orson Bean, David Doyle, Barnard Hughes, Pert Kelton, Burgess Meredith, and Eli Mintz.

External links 
 

1964 plays
Broadway plays
Little, Brown and Company books